This is a list of historical lieutenant governors of the North-West Territories, Canada. The position of Lieutenant Governor lasted from the acquisition of Rupert's Land and the North-Western Territory in 1869 to the creation of Alberta and Saskatchewan in 1905.

Since the establishment of Saskatchewan and Alberta from the Territories' most populated regions, the territory had no lieutenant governor. Instead, a commissioner represents the federal government and acts as the  representative of the King. Yukon was carved out of the North-West Territories in 1898 and has had its own commissioners since then.

See also
Commissioners of Northwest Territories
List of Northwest Territories premiers
List of Northwest Territories general elections

Notes

References

North-West Territories
 
Lieutenant governors